Bon Darreh or Bondarreh or Bondareh or Bandareh may refer to:
 Bon Darreh, Fars
 Bondareh, Shiraz, Fars Province
 Bandareh, Kermanshah Province
 Bondarreh, Dana, Kohgiluyeh and Boyer-Ahmad Province
 Bon Darreh, Kohgiluyeh, Kohgiluyeh and Boyer-Ahmad Province
 Bandareh, West Azerbaijan